Dubai Festival City is a large residential, business and entertainment development in the city of Dubai, United Arab Emirates, owned by Al-Futtaim Group. Dubai Festival City is the Middle East's largest mixed-use development: all elements for work, living, and leisure will be contained within the project. Once completed Festival City will comprise a series of residential communities, numerous hotels, malls, a golf course and other entertainment sites, and a full suite of public services, including schools.

Description

Construction of the development, which was undertaken by Al Futtaim Carillion, began in 2003 and was expected to take 12 years. As of mid-2006, investments in the project had exceeded 11 billion AED (3 billion USD).

Within the development, Waagner Biro also constructed seven pavilions.

Hotels
The development includes two hotels including the InterContinental Dubai Festival City and a long-term stay serviced apartment complex, all managed by InterContinental Hotels Group. In July 2009, InterContinental took over management of the Al Badia Golf Course. Developments include the 400-room Four Seasons Hotel Dubai, but construction of both hotels was put on hold in January 2009 due to the Global financial crisis of 2008–2009.

Dubai Festival City Mall

The Festival Waterfront Centre, is a retail power centre which includes IKEA, HyperPanda supermarket (first hypermarket outside of Saudi Arabia, which has now been replaced with a Carrefour supermarket) and Ace Hardware. Robinsons Department Store from Singapore opened inside Dubai Festival City Mall in March 2017.

Transport
There is an Abra boat service across Dubai Creek between the Dubai Festival City Mall and the Al Jaddaf Marine Station, close to the Dubai Creek metro station on the green Line of the Dubai Metro. This is operated by the Dubai Roads and Transport Authority (RTA).

See also
Tourism in Dubai

References

External links

 Dubai Festival City website

Buildings and structures in Dubai
Geography of Dubai
Mixed-use developments in the United Arab Emirates